Uttoxeter Rural is a civil parish in the district of East Staffordshire, Staffordshire, England.  It contains 25 buildings that are recorded in the National Heritage List for England.  Of these, one is at Grade II*, the middle grade, and the others are at Grade II, the lowest grade.  The parish contains the countryside around the market town of Uttoxeter  It includes the villages of Bramshall and Stramshall and smaller settlements, and is otherwise rural.  Most of the listed buildings are houses and farmhouses,  The other listed buildings include churches, a country house and associated structures, watermills and mill houses, bridges, and mileposts.

For the listed buildings in the town of Uttoxeter, see Listed buildings in Uttoxeter.


Key

Buildings

References

Citations

Sources

Lists of listed buildings in Staffordshire